Flat Top Island Light is an inactive lighthouse located on Flat Top Island, a small island off the entrance to Mackay harbor at the mouth of Pioneer River, about  east of Mackay, Queensland, Australia. It used to mark the river entrance for shipping and the direction of the port, as well as highlighting close by shoals at Shoalwater Point and a reef off Hay Point. At  from the ground to the lantern floor, it is the shortest of Queensland's timber-framed iron clad lighthouses.

History

Tenders for the construction of the lighthouse were called in February 1877, and the tender accepted on September of that year was by Archibald McIntyre. Construction commenced in December 1877 and complete in May 1878. However, the lighthouse was not officially lit, as the permanent apparatus was not available and a temporary one was used. The light was officially lit only on 27 December 1879 with the installation of the permanent apparatus. As typical for lighthouses of that period in Queensland, the tower is conical in shape, built of an internal timber frame, clad with galvanized iron plates. It showed white light for directions clear of danger (except where obscured by the close by Round Top Island) and red over danger. An additional red sector was later installed to show further dangerous locations. The lighthouse is currently painted white with a red dome.

In January 1918 the lighthouse was the only structure on the island and the only aid to navigation to survive the 1918 Mackay cyclone. The lighthouse was automated around 1920. In 1991, the light source was still an open flame acetylene gas burner.

The light was discontinued in March 2007 and it is currently conserved on site. The last light characteristic displayed was four flashes every twenty seconds, red and white depending on the direction (Fl.(4)W.R. 20s).

Site operation and visiting
The lighthouse is currently inactive. Before that, it was operated by the Australian Maritime Safety Authority. The island is accessible only by boat. It is unclear whether public access to the site and tower are available.

See also

 List of lighthouses in Australia

Notes

References

External links

Lighthouses completed in 1878
Lighthouses in Queensland
Queensland places listed on the defunct Register of the National Estate
Buildings and structures in North Queensland
1878 establishments in Australia
History of transport in Queensland